Thiorhodovibrio winogradskyi is a purple sulfur bacteria, the type species of its genus. Its cells are vibrioid-to spirilloid-shaped and motile by means of single polar flagella. It is moderately halophilic, with type strain SSP1 (=DSM 6702).

References

Further reading

External links

LPSN
WORMS
Type strain of Thiorhodovibrio winogradskyi at BacDive -  the Bacterial Diversity Metadatabase

Chromatiales
Bacteria described in 1993